The Gyeongju Seokbinggo is a seokbinggo or ice house located in the neighborhood of Inwang-dong, Gyeongju, North Gyeongsang province, South Korea. It literally means "stone ice storage" in Korean.

Gyeongju Seokbinggo was originally built as a wooden storage in the Wolseong Fortress by the buyun (부윤, county magistrate) Jo Myeong-gyeom (조명겸) in 1738, the 14th year of King Yeongjo's reign during the Joseon Dynasty. It was moved to the current place four years later, which can be verified by the keystone scripts on the entrance and the monument standing next to the storage. The old seokbinggo site still remains about 100m west from the current one. 

The Gyeongju Seokbinggo has been designated as the 66th Treasure of South Korea in 1963 and is managed by the Department of Culture and Tourism of Gyeongju.

Gallery

See also
Tourism in Gyeongju
Architecture of Korea
Yakhchal, an ancient Persian refrigerator

References

External links

Gyeongju Seokbinggo (Stone ice storage in Gyeongju) at Gyeongju U-tourism Organization

Buildings and structures in Gyeongju
Infrastructure completed in 1738
Joseon dynasty
Treasures of South Korea
Tourist attractions in Gyeongju
Ice trade